Sony Music Entertainment Mexico is a Mexican record label, and the regional Sony Music subsidiary in Mexico. It is one of the most important labels in Mexico along with Universal Music Mexico and Warner Music Mexico.

History

CBS Records and RCA Victor in Mexico (1961-80) 
During the early sixties, the American companies RCA Victor and CBS Records (today RCA and Columbia Records) arrived in Mexico, CBS founded "Discos CBS de México" and RCA created "RCA Victor Mexicana"; both with the aim of manufacturing and distributing the vinyl of their Anglo-Saxon artists, as well as sealing and recording with Mexican artists. Both, along with other Mexican record companies of the time, were founding members of the Mexican Association of Phonograms and Videograms Producers (AMPROFON) in 1963, an association that certifies gold and platinum records in Mexico.

Sony CBS and BMG (1981-2003) 
Bertelsmann Music Group, bought Ariola Records and the American RCA, and with it, BMG Music Mexico was started. In 1987, the record label CBS Records was officially renamed as Columbia Records, and the company previously known as CBS Records was renamed Sony Music Entertainment, with this the Mexican label became.

Sony BMG México (2004-2008) 
Around 2004, Sony Music Entertainment and BMG made a commercial alliance called Sony BMG, resulting from this alliance Sony BMG Music Entertainment Mexico, during this time Sony made artists like Reik, Julieta Venegas, Belinda, Natalia Lafourcade, Ha*Ash, Yuridia and Carlos Rivera, most of these still continuing on the label at the present time.

Sony Music Entertainment México (2009-present) 
Sony Music would end up buying BMG 4 years later in 2008 and with this the BMG catalogue, in addition to this, an image change would also be made internationally. Sony BMG Mexico would become Sony Music Entertainment Mexico in charge of the Argentine businessman Roberto López in 2009, today being one of the most important labels, at this time the Primera Fila format emerged, the alliances for soundtracks for Netflix, such as those of Roma, Luis Miguel: The Series and Rebelde, and the alliance with the company BOBO Producciones for the physical release of the 90's Pop Tour projects.

Current artists 
The follow is a list of artists current signed to Sony Music Mexico:

 
 Ana Gabriel
 Carlos Rivera
 CD9
 Christian Nodal (since 2021)
 Gerardo Ortiz
 Ha*Ash
 Humbe
 Kenia Os
 Lila Downs
 Little Jesus
 Matisse
 Natalia Lafourcade
 Pandora
 Paulina Rubio
 Reik
 Vicente Fernandez
 Yuri
 Yuridia

Former artists 

 Alejandro Fernandez
 Amandititita
 Belinda
 Fey
 Gloria Trevi
 Julieta Venegas

References 

 
Sony Music
Record labels established in 1961
Mexican record labels